Don Bosco Institute of Technology is the name of various technical institutions across the world:
 Don Bosco Institute of Technology, Mumbai
 Don Bosco Institute of Technology, Bangalore

See also 
 Don Bosco Technical Institute
 Don Bosco School (disambiguation)